The Thing About Men is a musical with music by Jimmy Roberts and lyrics and book by Joe DiPietro. It is based on the 1985 German film Men by Doris Dörrie. The plot revolves around a love triangle and shows what men will do to keep their pride and love affairs intact.

Productions

Off-Broadway
The show opened Off-Broadway at the Promenade Theatre on August 23, 2003 following previews from August 6. It closed on February 15, 2004 after playing more than 200 performances. The cast featured Marc Kudisch, (who originated the role of the cuckolded and philandering husband, Tom), Jennifer Simard (Greek chorus), Daniel Reichard (Greek chorus), Ron Bohmer (Sebastian) and Leah Hocking (Lucy). Graham Rowat played the final week of the run as Tom. The musical was directed by Mark Clements with musical staging by Rob Ashford.

London
The musical played at the King's Head Theatre in London from April 30, 2007, following previews from April 25, 2007. The limited six week season ended on June 3, 2007. The production was directed by Anthony Drewe and the cast included Hal Fowler, Tim Rogers and Paul Baker.

In 2012 The Thing About Men played at the Landor Theatre, London; directed by Andrew Keates and featured John Addison, Lucyelle Cliffe, Peter Gerald, Kate Graham and Steven Webb.

Song list

Opening/Oh, What a Man! — Tom, Lucy, Man & Woman
No Competition for Me - Tom, Taxi Driver
Opportunity Knocking — Tom
Free, Easy Guy — Sebastian, Lucy
Free, Easy Guy (Reprise) - Tom
Take Me Into You — Sebastian, Lucy
Because - Lucy
The Confession - Priest
The Greatest Friend — Sebastian, Tom
Downtown Bohemian Slum — Company 

You Will Never Get Into This Restaurant - Maitre'd
Me, Too - Sebastian, Cindy, Waiter, Tom
One-Woman Man - Sebastian, Cindy, Waiter, Tom
Take Me Into You (Reprise) - Lucy
Highway of Your Heart - Country Singer
The Better Man Won - Tom
The Road to Lucy - Tom, Sebastian, Lucy 
Make Me a Promise, Thomas - Tom, Lucy
New, Beautiful Man - Tom, Sebastian, Stylist
Time to Go Home - Tom
Finale/You Can Have It All — Company

Awards and nominations
 2004 Drama Desk Award, Outstanding Featured Actress in a Musical, Simard (nomination)
 2004 Outer Critics Circle Award, Best Off-Broadway Musical (win)

References

External links
Internet Off-Broadway database

2003 musicals
Off-Broadway musicals